Woody Woodpecker is the first animated cartoon short subject in the Woody Woodpecker series. Released theatrically on July 7, 1941, the film was produced by Walter Lantz Productions and distributed by Universal Pictures.

This is the second appearance of Woody Woodpecker; his debut was in an Andy Panda cartoon, Knock Knock.

The working title of this cartoon is 'Cracked Nut'.

Plot
The inhabitants of the forest that Woody Woodpecker (Mel Blanc) lives in have started spreading the word that Woody is crazy, due to all of his screwball antics. After telling him (and many others) this several times, Woody also begins to question his sanity. Woody Woodpecker spends his day singing loudly and pecking holes in trees. He infuriates the other woodland creatures - when he isn't baffling them with his bizarre behavior. Woody overhears a squirrel and a group of birds gossiping about him. Even though he just sang a song proclaiming his craziness, he denies their whispered accusations that he's nuts. But after they trick him into knocking his head on a statue, the poor bird hears voices in his head and decides the animals might be right. He decides to see a doctor. But leave it to Woody to choose Dr. Horace N. Buggy, a Scottish-brogue-burring fox (Which was a prototype version of Fink Fox) who is, if it's impossible, even madder than he is. The story ends with Woody hurled into a movie theater audience, watching the doctor crack up on screen, and annoying the people beside him ("That doctor sure is a card, isn't he? But I don't think he's near as funny as the woodpecker! Do you think so, mister? Huh? DO you, mister? HUH? I like cartoons! Don't YOU like cartoons??"). One of the people then puts up Woody’s seat, leaving him stuck. Then, he screams for help from his seat. As for the people beside him, they smile gladly as the cartoon ends.

Notes
There is no director credit for the film. Lantz himself has claimed to have directed Woody Woodpecker.

References

External links

1941 films
Films about psychiatry
Films directed by Walter Lantz
Walter Lantz Productions shorts
Woody Woodpecker films
1940s American animated films
1941 animated films
Universal Pictures animated short films
Animated films about animals
Animated films about birds